Qardin (also Romanized as Qardīn) is a village in Nur Ali Beyk Rural District, in the Central District of Saveh County, Markazi Province, Iran. At the 2006 census, its population was 1,092, in 294 families.

References 

Populated places in Saveh County